Dead Ringer or Dead Ringers may refer to:

 Dead ringer (idiom)

Books
 The Dead Ringer, a 1948 mystery novel by Fredric Brown
 Dead Ringer, novel in the Rosato & Associates series
 Dead Ringer (comics), a Marvel Comics character

Film and television

 Dead Ringer (1964 film), starring Bette Davis, Peter Lawford, and Karl Malden
 Dead Ringer (1981 film), directed by Allan F. Nicholls
 "Dead Ringer" (CSI), a fourth-season episode of CSI: Crime Scene Investigation
 Dead Ringers (comedy), a British satirical programme, which exists in television and radio versions
 Dead Ringers (film), a 1988 film directed by David Cronenberg and starring Jeremy Irons as identical twin gynecologists
 Dead Ringers (TV series), a remake of the 1988 film
Dead Ringers: The Making of Touch of Grey, a 1987 music documentary film about the American rock group the Grateful Dead

Music
 Dead Ringer (album), a 1981 album by Meat Loaf
 Deadringer (album), hip-hop artist RJD2's 2002 debut album
 "Dead Ringer", a song by The Stranglers off their album No More Heroes
 "Deadringer", a song by Knocked Loose, off their album Laughing Tracks
 "Dead Ringer", a 64k demo by Fairlight released at Assembly in 2006

See also
 "Deadly Ringer", a 1977 episode of The Bionic Woman
 Dead bell, a hand bell used in conjunction with deaths